"The Hand That Feeds" is a song by American industrial rock band Nine Inch Nails, released as the lead single from their fourth studio album, With Teeth (2005).

The single is the highest-charting Nine Inch Nails song on all charts except for Billboard Modern Rock Tracks, where it stayed at number one for five weeks (the following single "Only" stayed at number one for seven non-consecutive weeks), and the Billboard Hot 100, where it peaked at number 31. It is the band's only single to reach the top 10 of the UK Singles Chart, as well as their highest-charting single on the U.S. Mainstream Rock Tracks chart, peaking at number two. It was also a crossover hit, crossing over to pop radio as their first top 40 radio hit since "Closer" in 1994 and "Hurt" in 1995, peaking at number 31 on the Billboard Hot 100 chart. In terms of overall chart performance, the song is beaten only by the group's 1999 song "The Day the World Went Away".

History
Though several radio stations played a leaked copy of the song in February 2005, official radio play began the following month on March 14. The song was released for sale on both iTunes and Napster on March 22. In April, a link to a multi-track GarageBand file of the song was posted on the band's website, allowing anyone with GarageBand to remix it.

The single for "The Hand That Feeds" was only given a wide release in Europe. The European releases include a 3-track limited edition CD, a 2-track standard CD, a 9-inch vinyl and a DVD single. In the United States, "The Hand That Feeds" was released on various vinyl formats.  A limited edition 10-inch picture disc and a 7-inch promotional disc (the latter available at With Teeth listening parties) contained the title track and the b-side "Home."  Additional 12-inch remix records, containing mixes by Photek and DFA were also available.

The band was due to play the song at the 2005 MTV Movie Awards, but dropped out due to conflicts between Reznor and MTV concerning his plan to incorporate an image of then-incumbent U.S. President George W. Bush into the performance. An announcement made by Reznor through the band's website on May 26 stated, "Nine Inch Nails will not be performing at the MTV Movie Awards as previously announced. We were set to perform 'The Hand That Feeds' with an unmolested, straightforward image of George W. Bush as the backdrop. Apparently, the image of our president is as offensive to MTV as it is to me. See you on tour this fall when we return to play in America."

The following day, MTV stated, "While we respect Nine Inch Nails' point of view, we were uncomfortable with their performance being built around a partisan political statement. When we discussed our discomfort with the band, their choice was to unfortunately pull out of the Movie Awards." The band was eventually replaced by Foo Fighters at the ceremony. During a performance of "The Hand That Feeds" in Jacksonville, Florida, on October 29, 2008, a photo of Bush was displayed behind the band; as the band played, the photo gradually morphed into John McCain, the Republican candidate for the 2008 U.S. presidential election.

The song was nominated for Best Hard Rock Performance for the 48th Annual Grammy Awards in 2006. It is included in the videogames Rock Band, Midnight Club 3, Guitar Hero: Warriors of Rock, and Rock Band 4. The song also appears in the trailer for the film Red Riding Hood and in the TV spots for Underworld: Evolution and Running Scared.

In 2009, the song ranked at number 406 in Pitchfork's list of the top 500 songs of the 2000s.

Music video
The music video for the song was directed by Reznor and Rob Sheridan and debuted on the Nine Inch Nails website. The video features Reznor alongside the band he assembled for live performances at the time (Aaron North, Jeordie White, Jerome Dillon, and Alessandro Cortini) performing the song. The video uses the pan and scan technique, resulting in video distortion such as pixelization and interlacing. During the final chorus, the band members become more distorted by additional interlacing. A second video for the song was directed by Ian Inaba, but was shelved.

Releases
 Island Records CID888 - CD
 Island Records CIDV888 - DVD
 Island Records 9IS888 - 9-inch vinyl
 Interscope Records HALO_18 V2 - 10-inch picture disc (limited edition)
 Interscope Records INTR-11401-7 - 7-inch vinyl (promo)
 Interscope Records B0005127-11 - 12-inch vinyl, Photek remixes
 Interscope Records B0005129-11 - 12-inch vinyl, DFA remixes

Track listing

Charts

Weekly charts

Year-end charts

See also
List of anti-war songs

References

External links

nin.com
The Hand That Feeds at the NinWiki
Halo 18 at NINCollector.com
discogs.com: The Hand that Feeds (UK CD5")
discogs.com: The Hand that Feeds (UK DVD)
discogs.com: The Hand that Feeds (UK 9")
discogs.com: The Hand that Feeds (US 10")
discogs.com: The Hand that Feeds (Photek Remix 12")
discogs.com: The Hand that Feeds (DFA Remix 12")

2005 singles
Nine Inch Nails songs
Song recordings produced by Trent Reznor
Songs written by Trent Reznor
2005 songs
Interscope Records singles
American hard rock songs
American new wave songs